Øystein Løseth (born ) is the chairman of the board of Norwegian oil company Statoil. He was CEO of the Swedish state-owned energy company Vattenfall.

References

Norwegian chairpersons of corporations
Norwegian business executives
1958 births
Equinor people
Norwegian University of Science and Technology alumni
Norwegian economists
Living people